The 2020–21 Texas Tech Red Raiders basketball team represented Texas Tech University in the 2020–21 NCAA Division I men's basketball season as a member of the Big 12 Conference. The Red Raiders were led by fifth-year coach Chris Beard. They played their home games at the United Supermarkets Arena in Lubbock, Texas. They finished the season 18-11, 9-8 in Big 12 Play to tie for 6th place. They lost in the quarterfinals of the Big 12 tournament to Texas. They received an at-large bid to the NCAA tournament where they defeated Utah State in the First Round before losing in the Second Round to Arkansas.

Previous season
The Red Raiders finished the season 18–13, 9–9 in Big 12 play to finish in 6th place in the division. They were scheduled to play Texas in the quarterfinals of the Big 12 tournament before the tournament was canceled due to the ongoing COVID-19 pandemic. All postseason play, including the NCAA tournament, was also canceled due to the pandemic.

Offseason

Departures

Incoming transfers
Texas Tech added three players, Marcus Santos-Silva, Mac McClung, and Jamarius Burton as transfers. On April 29, 2020, Santos-Silva announced he was transferring in from VCU. On May 27, 2020, McClung announced that he was transferring in from Georgetown. On September 17, 2020, Burton received a waiver from the NCAA and thus became immediately eligible following his transfer from Wichita State.

Recruits

Recruiting class of 2020

Roster

Schedule and results

|-
!colspan=12 style=|Regular season

|-
!colspan=9 style=|Big 12 Tournament

|-
!colspan=9 style=|NCAA tournament

Rankings

*AP does not release post-NCAA tournament rankings.
No Coaches Poll for Week 1.

References

Texas Tech Red Raiders basketball seasons
Texas Tech
Texas Tech
Texas Tech
Texas Tech